Gregory James Coleman (29 June 1949 – 16 September 2005) was a classical guitarist, educator, composer, and arranger.

Coleman taught classical guitar for over 42 years at Saddleback College, Orange Coast College, Irvine Valley College, University of Redlands, Cal State San Bernardino, and privately. He studied with renowned guitarists, including Laurindo Almeida, Christopher Parkening, Joe Pass, Howard Roberts, and Pepe Romero. Coleman's father Ervan Coleman was a studio guitarist, a founding member of the Baja Marimba Band, and a session player with The Tijuana Brass.

Coleman attended Saddleback College and the University of California, Irvine. He died from melanoma on 16 September 2005 in Trabuco Canyon.

Discography

References

1949 births
American classical guitarists
American male guitarists
2005 deaths
Musicians from Orange County, California
Guitarists from California
20th-century American guitarists
Classical musicians from California
20th-century American male musicians
20th-century classical musicians